Henry Holmes Croft (March 6, 1820 in London – March 1, 1883 in San Diego, Texas) was a British scientist and educator in Canada.

Croft was invited to join the faculty at King's College (now University of Toronto) in Toronto, arriving in 1842. From 1850 to 1853 he was university vice-chancellor and later with the university senate.

Croft was a member of the University Rifle Corps (9th Company of The Queen's Own Rifles of Canada) in the 1860s and participated in the Fenian raids as captain in 1866. Croft left Toronto in 1880 to retire to his son's ranch in Texas.

He contributed to the foundation of the Entomological Society of Canada.

References

External links
 Biography at the Dictionary of Canadian Biography Online
 The Canadian Encyclopedia
 

British scientists
Academic staff of the University of Toronto
1820 births
1883 deaths